Lawrence County Courthouse is a historic courthouse located at Mount Vernon, Lawrence County, Missouri.  It was built in 1900, and is a rectangular, 2 1/2-story, Romanesque Revival style limestone building. It measures 101 feet, 8 inches, by 81 feet, 2 inches.  It features a central clock and bell tower surmounted with a statue of Lady Justice.

It was listed on the National Register of Historic Places in 1980.

References

Clock towers in Missouri
County courthouses in Missouri
Courthouses on the National Register of Historic Places in Missouri
Romanesque Revival architecture in Missouri
Government buildings completed in 1900
Buildings and structures in Lawrence County, Missouri
National Register of Historic Places in Lawrence County, Missouri